The Gimli International Film Festival is a Canadian film festival, held annually in Gimli, Manitoba. It is Manitoba's largest film festival, showcasing a mix of narrative, documentary and experimental feature films and short films.

History
The Gimli Film Festival began in 2001, originally launched as an outgrowth of the town's Islendingadagurinn festival of Icelandic Canadian culture.

The festival takes place annually on the last weekend of July and has grown to include four indoor venues, industry workshops and events, an annual $10,000 emerging filmmaker pitch competition, a 48 Hour Filmmaking Challenge, and a variety of awards and parties.  The festival is also known for its free outdoor beach film screenings, where films are projected on an 11-meter-tall screen erected annually in the waters of Lake Winnipeg.

The festival was founded in part by former Senator Janis Johnson.

References

External links
 

Film festivals in Manitoba
Gimli, Manitoba
Film festivals established in 2001
Annual events in Manitoba